Grego Anderson (born 1967) is an American blues musician and folk artist, living in Austin, Texas, United States.

Art
His artwork has been exhibited in galleries from Boston, Massachusetts to San Diego, California, and is featured in the Mojohand online gallery. His work is best described as "rustic;" he paints only portraits of blues musicians on wooden planks. His work appears as the cover art for blues musician Selwyn Birchwood's 2017 album, Pick Your Poison.

Honors
Anderson was recognized by the United States Congress in 2003 as one of two official visual artists for the Year of the Blues.

Appearances
Anderson appears in the Lightnin' Hopkins' documentary film, Where Lightnin' Strikes—the Lightnin’ Hopkins story, and on the Veria television program, The Art of Living.

Music
Anderson is also a blues musician, playing lap steel guitar with The Freight Train Troubadours and Los Pistoles in Austin Texas, and as a sideman throughout the Americas.

See also

 Folk art

References

1967 births
Living people
American blues guitarists
American male guitarists
Artists from Austin, Texas
Musicians from Austin, Texas
Guitarists from Texas
20th-century American guitarists
20th-century American male musicians